George Harley Kirk (1831 – 13 March 1912) was an Irish Home Rule League politician.

He was elected a Member of Parliament (MP) for County Louth at a by-election in 1874 but was defeated at the next general election in 1880.

References

External links
 

1831 births
1912 deaths
Home Rule League MPs
UK MPs 1874–1880
Members of the Parliament of the United Kingdom for County Louth constituencies (1801–1922)